"Home" is a song from the 1975 Broadway musical, The Wiz. It was written by Charlie Smalls and was performed by Stephanie Mills in the stage production and by Diana Ross in the 1978 film adaptation and released on the soundtrack album in 1978.

1989 recording
Stephanie Mills re-recorded the song for her 1989 album of the same name with background vocals by Take 6. The single release scored her another number one on the Billboard Hot Black Singles chart. The single was the last of five number ones for Mills on the R&B Singles chart.

Track listing
US 7" 45 RPM Single

A1. "Home" - 4:34

B1. "Love Hasn't Been Easy on Me" - 4:44

Charts

Personnel
Arranged by Donald Lawrence, Donald Robinson, Nick Martinelli, Stephanie Mills
Background arrangement – Mervyn Warren
Strings and horns arrangement – The Brothers Kerber
Backing vocals – Take 6
Bass – Douglas Grigsby
Drums, percussion, emulator, synthesizer – Jim Salamone
Electric piano, synthesizer – Curtis Dowd
Assistant engineer – John Sullivan, Sal Viarelli
Guitar – Randy Bowland
Keyboards – Donald Robinson
Producer – Nick Martinelli
Recorded by Bruce Weeden
Written by Charlie Smalls

Cover versions
In 1978, Andrea McArdle sang the song in Christmas at Walt Disney World.
Whitney Houston made her world debut on The Merv Griffin Show on April 29, 1983 performing this song. She had covered the song several times in concert during her US Tour 1985, Whitney: The Concert for a New South Africa 1994 HBO TV special, and her My Love Is Your Love Tour in 1999. Her 1983 performance on The Merv Griffin Show was included in the CD/DVD release Whitney Houston Live: Her Greatest Performances and as a bonus on the DVD Whitney: The Greatest Hits and the 25th anniversary deluxe edition of her debut album.
In 2007, Melinda Doolittle performed the song on American Idol (season 6) and subsequently released a studio version.
In 2012, a version by Barbra Streisand recorded in 1985 for The Broadway Album but not initially released was finally included on Release Me.

In popular culture

An 11-year-old Jazmine Sullivan sang the show at her elementary school performance of The Wiz in 1999. The home video clip posted on YouTube has had over one million views.
In 2010, the song was used in an episode of Glee's first season called "Home", sung by Kristin Chenoweth.
In 2015, Shanice Williams performed this song live in the Broadway/television adaptation of both the film and Broadway version of The Wiz.
Gladys Knight performed the songs at a BET 85th Birthday Celebration Tribute to Quincy Jones in 2018.
In 2018, MJ Rodriguez and Billy Porter, as their characters Blanca Evangelista and Pray Tell, respectively, sang the song as a duet in the episode "Love Is The Message" of the television series Pose.
In 2019, Glennis Grace performed the song in a concert event Whitney: A Tribute by Glennis Grace (Live In Concert) in Rotterdam Ahoy (The Netherlands) and Lotto Arena (Belgium) with her tribute to Whitney Houston. 
In 2020, Johnny Manuel performed the song in the blind auditions of The Voice Australia Season 9 giving Manuel a four chair turn but Kelly Rowland was blocked from being chosen to be given a chance coach Manuel.

Samples
In 2003, this song was sampled in the song "Homies 2 Smoke With"  by Violent J recorded for his second  EP called Wizard of the Hood.

References

1975 songs
1989 singles
Stephanie Mills songs
Songs from musicals
Songs written by Charlie Smalls
Song recordings produced by Nick Martinelli
Contemporary R&B ballads
Soul ballads
Diana Ross songs
1970s ballads